Paolo Ruffini (Valentano, 22 September 1765 – Modena, 10 May 1822) was an  Italian mathematician and philosopher.

Education and Career 
By 1788 he had earned university degrees in philosophy, medicine/surgery and mathematics. His works include developments in algebra:
 an incomplete proof (Abel–Ruffini theorem) that quintic (and higher-order) equations cannot be solved by radicals (1799),
 Ruffini's rule which is a quick method for polynomial division,
 contributions to group theory.

He also wrote on probability and the quadrature of the circle.

He was a professor of mathematics at the University of Modena and a medical doctor including scientific work on typhus.

Group theory
In 1799 Ruffini marked a major improvement for group theory,   developing Joseph Louis Lagrange's work on permutation theory ("Réflexions sur la théorie algébrique des équations", 1770–1771). Lagrange's work was largely ignored until Ruffini established strong connections between permutations and the solvability of algebraic equations. Ruffini was the first to assert, controversially, the unsolvability by radicals of algebraic equations higher than quartics, which angered many members of the community such as Gian Francesco Malfatti (1731–1807). Work in that area was later carried on by those such as Abel and Galois, who succeeded in such a proof.

Publications

 1799: "Teoria Generale delle Equazioni, in cui si dimostra impossibile la soluzione algebraica delle equazioni generali di grado superiore al quarto" (General Theory of equations, in which the algebraic solution of general equations of degree higher than four is proven impossible).
 1802: "Riflessioni intorno alla rettificazione ed alla quadratura del circulo" (Reflections on the rectification and the squaring of the circle)
 1802: "Della soluzione delle equazioni algebraiche determinate particolari di grado superiore al quarto" (On the solution of certain determined algebraic equations of degree higher than four)
 1804: "Sopra la determinazione delle radici nelle equazioni numeriche di qualunque grado" (About the determination of the roots in the numerical equations of any degree)
 1806: "Della immortalità dell’anima" (On the immortality of the soul)
 1807: "Algebra elementare" (Elementary algebra)
 1813: "Riflessioni intorno alla soluzione delle equazioni algebraiche generali" (Reflections on the algebraic solutions of equations)
 1820: "Memoria sul tifo contagioso" (Essay on contagious typhoid)
 1821: "Riflessioni critiche sopra il saggio filosofico intorno alle probabilità del signor conte Laplace" (Critical reflections on the philosophical essay about probability by Count Laplace)

See also
8524 Paoloruffini, asteroid named after him

References

1765 births
1822 deaths
People from the Province of Viterbo
18th-century Italian mathematicians
19th-century Italian mathematicians
Algebraists